Tomi Pulkkinen (born 2 August 1992) is a figure skater who represented Switzerland until 2012 and began competing for Finland in 2013. Born in Helsinki, Finland, he moved to Switzerland when he was eight years old and became a dual citizen. After winning the silver medal at the 2009 Swiss Championships, he was sent to the 2009 European Championships, where he placed 33rd. He also competed at two World Junior Championships for Switzerland. In 2013, Pulkkinen began representing Finland and joined the Finnish club Järvenpään Taitoluistelijat (JTL).

Programs

Competitive highlights 
CS: Challenger Series; JGP: Junior Grand Prix

References

External links 
 

Finnish male single skaters
Swiss male single skaters
Swiss people of Finnish descent
1992 births
Living people
Sportspeople from Helsinki